The 2010 Swindon Borough Council election took place on 6 May 2010 to elect members of Swindon Unitary Council in Wiltshire, England. One third of the council was up for election and the Conservative Party stayed in overall control of the council.

After the election, the composition of the council was
Conservative 41
Labour 13
Liberal Democrat 4
Independent 1

Election result
The Conservatives retained their majority in the election, just losing one seat to have 41 councillors. The Conservative defeat came in Parks ward with Labour gaining the seat, while the only other change came in Penhill where the Liberal Democrats gained a previously independent seat. Among the Conservatives to retain a seat was the leader of the council, Roderick Bluh, who held Dorcan by a reduced majority of 460. After the election the other parties on the council were Labour with 13 seats, Liberal Democrats 4 and 1 independent.

Ward results

References

2010 English local elections
May 2010 events in the United Kingdom
2010
2010s in Wiltshire